Diego Mariño Villar (born 9 May 1990) is a Spanish professional footballer who plays for UD Almería as a goalkeeper.

Formed at Villarreal, he spent most of his career in the Segunda División with that club's first and second teams as well at Sporting de Gijón, making 289 appearances. He also played 85 La Liga games for Vallladolid, Levante and Sporting.

Club career

Villarreal
Born in Vigo, Galicia, Mariño played for Villarreal CF since the age of 14, having already represented four teams as a youth. He made his professional debut in the 2010–11 season, helping the reserves barely avoid relegation from the Segunda División while appearing in 38 games.

Mariño was again first choice the following campaign, but as the main squad suffered relegation in La Liga the B's were forced to drop down to Segunda División B even though they had finished in a comfortable 12th position. After the departures of longtime incumbent Diego López and 41-year-old César Sánchez (the latter retired), he was promoted to the first team by manager Julio Velázquez – also his boss in the second side.

Valladolid and Levante
Mariño signed a five-year contract with Real Valladolid on 5 July 2013, with Villarreal retaining an option to buy him back for €300,000. He made his debut in the top flight on 17 August, in a 1–2 home loss against Athletic Bilbao.

On 8 August 2014, Mariño moved to Levante UD of the same league in a season-long loan. On 31 August of the following year, he signed a permanent three-year deal with the club.

Sporting Gijón
On 1 July 2016, after Levante's relegation, Mariño joined Sporting de Gijón for four years. Second choice to Iván Cuéllar, he made his debut on 26 November in a 2–1 loss at leaders Real Madrid.

On 18 January 2018, Mariño extended his contract until 2022. Between 4 February and 1 April he was unbeaten during 764 minutes and, at the end of the season, he was named Sporting's player of the year.

In August 2019, another year was added to Mariño's contract. He remained first-choice at El Molinón in the ensuing seasons, even after the re-acquisition of Cuéllar in 2021. He suffered a right hamstring injury the following March and was replaced by the latter for ten games as the side successfully fought relegation, returning on 29 May for the final match of the campaign in a 1–0 home defeat against UD Las Palmas.

Almería
On 26 January 2023, Mariño returned to the top tier after agreeing to an 18-month contract with UD Almería.

International career
Mariño won his first cap for the Spain under-21 team in 2011. Also that year, he was selected by manager Luis Milla for his UEFA European Championship squad; in the tournament in Denmark, he was a backup to Atlético Madrid's David de Gea as the nation won its third title in the category. 

The following year, Mariño repeated the role for the under-23 side in a group-stage exit at the Summer Olympic Games in Great Britain.

Honours
Spain U21
UEFA European Under-21 Championship: 2011, 2013

Spain U17
FIFA U-17 World Cup runner-up: 2007

References

External links

1990 births
Living people
Spanish footballers
Footballers from Vigo
Association football goalkeepers
La Liga players
Segunda División players
Tercera División players
Villarreal CF C players
Villarreal CF B players
Villarreal CF players
Real Valladolid players
Levante UD footballers
Sporting de Gijón players
UD Almería players
Spain youth international footballers
Spain under-21 international footballers
Spain under-23 international footballers
Footballers at the 2012 Summer Olympics
Olympic footballers of Spain